The 2012–13 North Dakota State Bison men's basketball team represented North Dakota State University in the 2012–13 NCAA Division I men's basketball season. The Bison, led by sixth year head coach Saul Phillips, played their home games at the Bison Sports Arena, with one home game at the Fargodome, and were members of The Summit League. They finished the season 24–10, 12–4 in Summit League play to finish in third place. They advanced to the championship game of The Summit League tournament where they lost to South Dakota State. They were invited to the 2013 College Basketball Invitational where they lost in the first round to Western Michigan in overtime.

Roster

Schedule

|-
!colspan=9| Exhibition

|-
!colspan=9| Regular season

|-
!colspan=9| 2013 The Summit League men's basketball tournament

|-
! colspan=9 | 2013 College Basketball Invitational

Source:

References

North Dakota State Bison men's basketball seasons
North Dakota State
North Dakota State
North Dakota State Bison f
North Dakota State Bison f